The 1921 Women's Olympiad  and  was the first international women's sports event, a 5-day multi-sport event organised by Alice Milliat and held on 24–31 March 1921 in Monte Carlo at the International Sporting Club of Monaco. The tournament was formally called 1er Meeting International d'Education Physique Féminine de Sports Athlétiques. It was the first of three Women's Olympiads or "Monte Carlo Games" held annually at the venue, and the forerunner of the quadrennial Women's World Games, organised in 1922–34 by the International Women's Sports Federation founded by Milliat later in 1921.

Events
The games were organized by Alice Milliat and Camille Blanc, director of the "International Sporting Club de Monaco" as a response to the IOC decision not to include women's events in the 1924 Olympic Games. The games were attended by 100 participants from 5 nations: France, Italy, Switzerland, United Kingdom and Norway (mentioned by several sources, however no Norwegian athletes appear in the result lists).

The athletes competed in 10 events: running (60 metres, 250 metres, 800 metres, 4 x 75 metres relay, 4 x 175 metres relay and hurdling 65 metres), high jump, long jump, standing long jump (exhibition only), javelin and shot put. The tournament also held exhibition events in basketball, gymnastics, pushball and rhythmic gymnastics. The tournament was held at the "Tir aux Pigeons" in the gardens of the Monte Carlo Casino.

Results
All gold medals went to athletes from France and the United Kingdom. Medalists:

The basketball tournament was won by Team Great Britain after a win in the final against Team France with 8–7. A special commemorative medal was issued for the participants.
 Each athlete in the shot put and javelin throw events threw using their right hand, then their left. Their final mark was the total of the best mark with their right-handed throw and the best mark with their left-handed throw.

Legacy
The tournament was a great success and an important step for Women's sports. The 1922 Women's Olympiad and 1923 Women's Olympiad were held at the same Monaco venue; the 1922 event is sometimes confused with the 1922 Women's World Games held in Paris. The IAAF unveiled a commemorative plaque at the site of the games in 2008.

References

External links
 Image program (cover) (Vivremaville.mc)
 Image medals (Worldathletics.org)
 Mixed pictures 1921 Women's Olympiad (and 1922 Women's Olympiad) (Bibliothèque National de France-BNF)
 Pictures 1921 Women's Olympiad (Historiatletismo)
 Film from the 1921 Women's Olympiad (BritishPathe

Women's World Games
International sports competitions hosted by Monaco
1921 in multi-sport events
1921 in sports
1921 in Monaco
Multi-sport events in Monaco
1921 in women's sport